Brookings County is a county in the U.S. state of South Dakota. As of the 2020 United States Census, the population was 34,375, making it the fifth-most populous county in South Dakota. Its county seat is Brookings. The county was created in 1862 and organized in 1871.

Brookings County comprises the Brookings, SD Micropolitan Statistical Area.

History
The county was founded July 3, 1871, and was named for Wilmot Wood Brookings (1830-1905), a politician and pioneer of southeastern South Dakota. Medary was the first county seat, from 1871 to 1879, when it was moved to the city of Brookings.

Geography

Brookings County is on the east side of South Dakota. Its east boundary line abuts the west boundary line of the state of Minnesota. The Big Sioux River flows south-southeastward through the east central part of the county; its point of entry into Moody County marks Brookings County's lowest elevation: 1,568' (478m) ASL.

The county terrain consists of sloped flatlands, marked by numerous lakes and ponds especially in the western part. The area is largely devoted to agricultural use.

Major highways

 Interstate 29
 U.S. Highway 14

 U.S. Highway 14 Bypass
 U.S. Highway 81
 South Dakota Highway 13
 South Dakota Highway 30
 South Dakota Highway 324

Airports
 Brookings Regional Airport
 Arlington Municipal Airport

Adjacent counties

 Deuel County – north
 Lincoln County, Minnesota – east
 Pipestone County, Minnesota – southeast
 Moody County – south
 Lake County – southwest
 Kingsbury County – west
 Hamlin County – northwest

Lakes

 Brush Lake
 Johnson Lake
 Lake Campbell
 Lake Goldsmith
 Lake Hendricks (partial)
 Lake Poinsett
 Lake Sinai
 Lake Tetonkaha
 Oak Lake
 Oakwood Lake

Protected areas

 Aurora Prairie Nature Preserve
 Black Slough State Game Production Area
 Brookings County State Game Production Area
 Brookings Prairie Park
 Dakota Nature Park
 Deer Creek State Game Production Area
 Kvernmoe Slough State Game Production Area
 Lake Hendricks State Lakeside Use Area
 Lake Poinsett State Recreation Area
 Mehegan State Game Production Area
 Moe Slough State game Production Area
 Nelson State Game Production Area
 Oak Lake State Game Production Area
 Oakwood Lake State Game Production Area
 Oakwood Lakes State Park

Demographics

2000 census
As of the 2000 United States Census, there were 28,220 people, 10,665 households, and 6,217 families in the county. The population density was 36 people per square mile (14/km2). There were 11,576 housing units at an average density of 15 per square mile (6/km2). The racial makeup of the county was 96.36% White, 0.31% Black or African American, 0.90% Native American, 1.34% Asian, 0.04% Pacific Islander, 0.30% from other races, and 0.75% from two or more races. 0.88% of the population were Hispanic or Latino of any race. 39.2% were of German, 23.2% Norwegian and 5.7% Irish ancestry.

There were 10,665 households, out of which 28.60% had children under the age of 18 living with them, 49.00% were married couples living together, 6.60% had a female householder with no husband present, and 41.70% were non-families. 29.60% of all households were made up of individuals, and 8.60% had someone living alone who was 65 years of age or older. The average household size was 2.38 and the average family size was 2.97.

The county population contained 20.80% under the age of 18, 26.80% from 18 to 24, 24.30% from 25 to 44, 17.30% from 45 to 64, and 10.90% who were 65 years of age or older. The median age was 27 years. For every 100 females there were 102.10 males. For every 100 females age 18 and over, there were 101.20 males.

The median income for a household in the county was $35,438, and the median income for a family was $48,052. Males had a median income of $30,843 versus $22,074 for females. The per capita income for the county was $17,586. About 6.20% of families and 14.00% of the population were below the poverty line, including 10.10% of those under age 18 and 7.50% of those age 65 or over.

2010 census
As of the 2010 United States Census, there were 31,965 people, 12,029 households, and 6,623 families in the county. The racial makeup of the county was 93.2% white, 2.7% Asian, 0.9% American Indian, 0.8% black or African American, 0.9% from other races, and 1.4% from two or more races. Those of Hispanic or Latino origin made up 2.0% of the population. In terms of ancestry, 47.9% were German, 24.3% were Norwegian, 11.9% were Irish, 6.9% were English, 6.1% were Dutch, and 2.0% were American.

Of the 12,029 households, 25.9% had children under the age of 18 living with them, 45.6% were married couples living together, 6.1% had a female householder with no husband present, 44.9% were non-families, and 29.6% of all households were made up of individuals. The average household size was 2.36 and the average family size was 2.93. The median age was 26.3 years.

The median income for a household in the county was $45,134 and the median income for a family was $63,338. Males had a median income of $40,425 versus $30,023 for females. The per capita income for the county was $20,995. About 5.9% of families and 19.1% of the population were below the poverty line, including 8.2% of those under age 18 and 7.6% of those age 65 or over.

Communities

Cities

Arlington (partial)
Brookings (county seat)
Bruce
Elkton
Volga
White

Towns
 Aurora
 Bushnell
 Sinai

Census-designated places
Lake Poinsett

 Newdale Colony
 Norfeld Colony
 Rolland Colony

Unincorporated communities
 Ahnberg
Medary

Townships

 Afton
 Alton
 Argo
 Aurora
 Bangor
 Brookings
 Elkton
 Eureka
 Lake Hendricks
 Lake Sinai
 Laketon
 Medary
 Oaklake
 Oakwood
 Oslo
 Parnell
 Preston
 Richland
 Sherman
 Sterling
 Trenton
 Volga
 Winsor

Politics
Typical of the Great Plains, Brookings County voters are reliably Republican, even for a county with politics influenced by a college town. In only two national elections since 1932 has the county selected the Democratic Party candidate. Despite being reliably Republican territory, no Republican has taken over 60% of the vote since Ronald Reagan in 1984.

See also
National Register of Historic Places listings in Brookings County, South Dakota

References

External links

 Brookings County, SD government website

 
1871 establishments in Dakota Territory
Populated places established in 1871